Andreas Ibertsberger (born 27 July 1982) is an Austrian former professional footballer who played as a left-back. He was a member of the Austria national team. Ibertsberger is a younger brother of former national team player Robert Ibertsberger whose career was cut short by injury.

Club career
Ibertsberger played for SC Freiburg, for whom he signed from Austria Salzburg in January 2005. In January 2008, he moved to 1899 Hoffenheim, with whom he originally signed a pre-contract agreement for the 2008–09 season. With smalltown club Hoffenheim he won promotion to the German Bundesliga.

On 15 May 2012, Ibertsberger's contract with Hoffenheim expired, after missing the vast majority of the 2011–12 season with a chronic back problem.

International career
Ibertsberger made his debut for Austria in an October 2004 World Cup qualification match against Northern Ireland. He earned 14 caps, scoring one goal.

References

External links
 
 
 
 German Bundesliga stats at Fussballportal 
 Andreas Ibertsberger at the Austrian Official FA Website

1982 births
Living people
Footballers from Salzburg
Austrian footballers
Association football fullbacks
Austria international footballers
FC Red Bull Salzburg players
SC Freiburg players
TSG 1899 Hoffenheim players
Austrian Football Bundesliga players
Bundesliga players
2. Bundesliga players
MSV Duisburg players
Austrian expatriate footballers
Austrian expatriate sportspeople in Germany
Expatriate footballers in Germany